Central California is generally thought of as the middle third of the state, north of Southern California, which includes Los Angeles, and south of Northern California, which includes San Francisco. It includes the northern portion of the San Joaquin Valley (which itself is the southern portion of the Central Valley, beginning at the Sacramento–San Joaquin River Delta), part of the Central Coast, the central hills of the California Coast Ranges and the foothills and mountain areas of the central Sierra Nevada.

Central California is considered to be west of the crest of the Sierra Nevada. East of the Sierra is Eastern California. The largest cities in the region (over 50,000 population), from most to least populous, are Fresno, Bakersfield, Stockton, Modesto, Salinas, Visalia, Clovis, Santa Maria, Merced, Turlock, Madera, Lodi, Tulare, Porterville, Hanford and Delano. Over time, droughts and wildfires have increased in frequency and become less seasonal and more year-round, further straining the region's water security.

Geography 
Central California can have widely varying definitions depending on the context. Some divide the state by lines of latitude making northern, central and southern sections. Others divide by county lines or watershed boundaries. Some definitions include more of the San Joaquin Valley and even larger portions of the Central Valley. Some have less or none of Central Coast.

Counties 
Central California as defined above includes the following 10 counties:
 Fresno
 Kings
 Madera
 Mariposa
 Merced
 Monterey
 San Benito
 Stanislaus
 Tulare
 Tuolumne

The following counties are partially contained within central California:
 Calaveras
 Kern
 San Joaquin
 San Luis Obispo
 Santa Barbara
 Santa Cruz

Cities 
Area cities and towns listed below are major regional centers or county seats.
 Bakersfield
 Delano
 Fresno
 Hanford
 Hollister
 Lemoore
 Lodi
 Lompoc
 Madera
 Mariposa
 Merced
 Modesto
 Monterey
 Pismo Beach
 Paso Robles
 Porterville
 Salinas
 San Luis Obispo
 Santa Maria
 Sonora
 Stockton
 Tulare
 Turlock
 Visalia
 Watsonville
 Sacramento

Sub-regions 
The following regions are entirely contained within central California:
 Big Sur
 Kings Canyon National Park
 Metropolitan Fresno
 Pinnacles National Park
 Salinas Valley
 San Joaquin Valley
 Sequoia National Park
 Yosemite National Park

The following regions are partially contained within central California:
 California Coast Ranges
 Central Coast
 Diablo Range
 Gold Country
 Santa Barbara County
 Santa Cruz County
 Sierra Nevada Mountains
 Tehachapi Mountains

Education 
Central California has opened two new universities recently, one in each of the past two decades.

The University of California has one campus in the region. University of California, Merced opened on a newly constructed site on the east side of Merced in 2005.

The California State University system has four campuses in the region. California State University, Monterey Bay opened on the site of the former Fort Ord army base in 1994.  California State University, Stanislaus in Turlock opened in 1957. California State University, Fresno opened in 1911.

The Monterey Institute of International Studies is a graduate school that offers eleven master's degree programs in international policy, international management, language teaching, and translation and interpretation. The Monterey Institute of International Studies is a graduate school of Middlebury College.

San Joaquin College of Law is a private, nonprofit law school located in Clovis.

Fresno Pacific University is a private university in Fresno.

The Naval Postgraduate School and Defense Language Institute are located in Monterey.

The following community college campus sites are in the region:
 Columbia College in Sonora, Tuolumne County
 Clovis Community College in Clovis, Fresno County
 Fresno City College in Fresno, Fresno County
 Hartnell College in Salinas, Monterey County
 Merced College in Merced, Merced County
 Modesto Junior College in Modesto, Stanislaus County
 Monterey Peninsula College, Monterey, Monterey County
 Porterville College in Porterville, Tulare County
 Reedley College in Fresno, Fresno County
 College of the Sequoias in Visalia, Tulare County
 West Hills College Coalinga in Coalinga, Fresno County
 West Hills College Lemoore in Lemoore, Kings County
 Madera Community College in Madera, Madera County
Oakhurst Community College Center in Oakhurst, Madera County

There are no community colleges in Mariposa or San Benito Counties.

Transport

Major highways 
Most of the major highways in the region run north-south around the mountains.  Interstate 5 and State Route 99 are the primary highways in the San Joaquin Valley.  US 101 and State Route 1 are the major coastal highways.

Rail 
Passenger rail in the region consists of the Amtrak long-haul Coast Starlight and Amtrak California San Joaquin routes.

The California High-Speed Rail system is under planning.  If built, it would have stations in Fresno and Merced on the initial line between San Francisco/San Jose and Los Angeles.

Freight rail is served by commercial railroads.  Union Pacific Railroad and BNSF Railway operate mainline freight through the region in the Central Valley.

Air 
Major and regional airline service are available at Fresno Yosemite International Airport and Monterey Regional Airport.  Regional airline service is also available at Modesto City-County Airport, Merced Municipal Airport and Visalia Municipal Airport.

General Aviation airports exist in all 10 counties.  The largest are former military bases converted to civilian airports
 Castle Airport in Merced County
 Marina Municipal Airport in Monterey County
 Porterville Municipal Airport in Tulare County
 Salinas Municipal Airport in Monterey County
 Visalia Municipal Airport in Tulare County

An active military air base is at Naval Air Station Lemoore in Kings County and the 144th Fighter Wing is stationed at Fresno Air National Guard Base in Fresno County

Notes
Variations on significant/influential definitions of the term central California are collected in this section.

The following counties are self-described as being in central California or central within California:

 Fresno County
 Fresno County's intro paragraph on its web site says it is in central California.
 Madera County
 Madera County describes itself as located "in the exact center of California."
 Madera County Economic Development Commission describes the county as "located in the geographical center of California".
 Tulare County
 Tulare County describes itself as "centrally located within the State of California".

The following are definitions by influential organizations:
 The National Register of Historic Places splits California three ways with lines across the map, with central California being approximately above Los Angeles County and below Santa Clara and Merced Counties.
 The California Department of Transportation, or CalTrans, has a wide definition of the central portion of the state with several multi-county districts which have "central" in the name, combining the Central Coast and Central Valley.  The North Central district covers Sacramento to Chico.  The Central district covers Stockton to Merced, and Yosemite.  The South Central district covers Madera, Fresno, and Bakersfield.  The Central Coast district covers Santa Cruz to Monterey.
 The Central California chapter of the Better Business Bureau defines their central California region to exclude the coastal counties and include Mono, Inyo and Kern Counties.  Their definition is Fresno County, Inyo County, Kern County, Kings County, Madera County, Mariposa County, Merced County, Mono County, and Tulare County.

References
General

Specific

External links

 Central Valley Tourism Association
  CA Central Valley & Foothills, project area of the American Land Conservancy
 Central California Coast Guide

Regions of California
Northern California